Taxi Driver is a 1977 Indian Malayalam film, directed by P. N. Menon. The film stars Raghavan, M.G Prakash, S. P. Pillai and Sharada in the lead roles. The film has musical score by Joshi.

Cast
Raghavan 
Kuttyedathi Vilasini 
S. P. Pillai 
Sharada 
Satheesh Sathyan
Vidhubala
M.G Prakash
A.T.Samuel (Sam)

Soundtrack
The music was composed by Joshi and the lyrics were written by O. N. V. Kurup and Sreedharan Nair.

References

External links
 

1977 films
1970s Malayalam-language films
Films directed by P. N. Menon (director)